The Oslo Børs All Share Index (OSEAX) consists of all shares listed on Oslo Børs. The index is adjusted for corporate actions daily and the current outstanding number of shares is applied in the index. The OSEAX index is adjusted for dividend payments.

Annual Returns 
The following table shows the annual development of the OSEAX since 1983.

Constituents
AS at 17 November 2010, the constituent companies of the OSEAX are:

See also
Oslo Stock Exchange
List of companies listed on the Oslo Stock Exchange
OBX

References

External links
OSEAX Prices at Oslo Bors
OSEAX Historical Chart
Bloomberg page for OSEAX:IND
Reuters page for .OSEAX

Euronext indices
Oslo Stock Exchange